Scoloposcelis flavicornis is a species of bugs in the family Lyctocoridae. It is found in Central America and North America.

References

Further reading

 

Lyctocoridae
Articles created by Qbugbot
Insects described in 1871